The 1909 SAFL Grand Final was an Australian rules football competition. West Adelaide beat Port Adelaide by 59 to 41.

References 

SANFL Grand Finals